The Roman Catholic Diocese of Suifu/Yibin is a diocese located in the city of Yibin in the Ecclesiastical province of Chongqing in China.

History

 January 24, 1860: Established as Apostolic Vicariate of Southern Szechwan (四川南境) from the Apostolic Vicariate of Northwestern Szechwan 四川西北
 December 3, 1924: Renamed as Apostolic Vicariate of Suifu (Su-tcheou-fou; 敘府)
 April 11, 1946: Promoted as Diocese of Suifu (敘府)

Leadership
 Bishops of Suifu 敘府 (Roman rite)
 Bishop Peter Luo Xuegang (羅雪剛) (December 16, 2012 – present)
 Bishop John Chen Shi-zhong (陳適中) (1985 - 2012)
 Bishop René-Désiré-Romain Boisguérin, M.E.P. (April 11, 1946 – February 13, 1983)
 Vicars Apostolic of Suifu 敘府 (Roman Rite)
 Bishop René-Désiré-Romain Boisguérin, M.E.P. (January 10, 1946 – April 11, 1946)
 Bishop Louis-Nestor Renault, M.E.P. (October 19, 1931 – October 28, 1943)
 Bishop Jean-Pierre Fayolle, M.E.P. (November 26, 1920 – October 19, 1931)
 Vicars Apostolic of Southern Szechwan 南四川 (Roman Rite)
 Bishop Marc Chatagnon, M.E.P. (January 25, 1887 – November 26, 1920)
 Bishop Jules Lepley, M.E.P. (December 22, 1871 – March 6, 1886)
 Bishop Pierre-Julien Pichon, M.E.P. (January 24, 1860 – March 12, 1871)

See also
 Anglican Diocese of Szechwan
 Catholic Church in Sichuan

References
 GCatholic.org
 Catholic Hierarchy

Suifu
Religious organizations established in 1860
Roman Catholic dioceses and prelatures established in the 19th century
1860 establishments in China